Darren Isaac Devadass (born 3 February 1995) is a Malaysian badminton player. He won his first international title at the 2012 Smiling Fish International in the men's doubles event partnered with Tai An Khang. Devadass competed at the 2012 World and Asian Junior Championships, helped the team reaching the semi-finals, and settle for the bronze medal in Asia. In 2014, he and Tai finished as the runner-up at the Bangladesh International Challenge. Teamed-up with Vountus Indra Mawan, they clinched the men's doubles titles at the 2015 Auckland and Maribyrnong International tournament.

Achievements

BWF International Challenge/Series (3 titles, 1 runner-up) 
Men's doubles

  BWF International Challenge tournament
  BWF International Series tournament
  BWF Future Series tournament

References

External links 
 

1995 births
Living people
Malaysian male badminton players
Malaysian sportspeople of Indian descent
21st-century Malaysian people